The 1983 Virginia Slims of Houston was a women's tennis tournament played on indoor carpet courts at the Astro Arena in Houston, Texas in the United States that was part of the 1983 Virginia Slims World Championship Series. The tournament was held from January 10 through January 16, 1983. First-seeded Martina Navratilova won the singles title and earned $28,000 first-prize money.

Finals

Singles

 Martina Navratilova defeated  Sylvia Hanika 6–3, 7–6(7–5)
 It was Navratilova's 3rd title of the year and the 150th of her career.

Doubles

 Martina Navratilova /  Pam Shriver defeated  Jo Durie /  Barbara Potter 6–4, 6–3
 It was Navrtilova's 4th title of the year and the 151st of her career. It was Shriver's 2nd title of the year and the 36th of her career.

Prize money

References

External links
 ITF tournament edition details

Virginia Slims of Houston
Virginia Slims of Houston
Virginia Slims of Houston
Virginia Slims of Houston
Virginia Slims of Houston
Virginia Slims of Houston